Podlipa is a small village in the hills north of Dvor in the Municipality of Žužemberk in southeastern Slovenia. The municipality is included in the Southeast Slovenia Statistical Region and the wider area is part of the historical region of Lower Carniola.

References

External links
Podlipa at Geopedia

Populated places in the Municipality of Žužemberk